Celles-sur-Belle is a commune in the Deux-Sèvres department in the Nouvelle-Aquitaine region in western France. It is the site of an abbey dating from the 11th Century which was reconstructed between 1660 and 1685 on the orders of Louis XIV. On 1 January 2019, the former commune Saint-Médard was merged into Celles-sur-Belle.

See also
Communes of the Deux-Sèvres department

References

Communes of Deux-Sèvres